The 2012–13 season was Hamilton Academical's second consecutive season in the Scottish First Division, having been relegated from the Scottish Premier League at the end of the 2010–11 season. Hamilton also competed in the Challenge Cup, League Cup and the Scottish Cup.

Summary

Season
During season 2012–13 Hamilton finished fifth in the Scottish First Division. They reached the first round of the Challenge Cup, the third round of the League Cup and the Quarter-final of the Scottish Cup.

Management
Hamilton began the season under the management of Billy Reid. On 3 April 2013, Reid left the club by mutual consent after nearly eight years in charge of the team. Club captain Alex Neil and Hamilton's Academy director Frankie McAvoy took charge of the team until the end of the season on an interim basis.

Results and fixtures

Pre season

Scottish First Division

Scottish Challenge Cup

Scottish League Cup

Scottish Cup

Player statistics

Captains

Squad 
Last updated 7 May 2013

|}

Disciplinary record
Includes all competitive matches.
Last updated 7 May 2013

Team statistics

League table

Division summary

Transfers

Players in

Players out

References

Hamilton Academical F.C. seasons
Hamilton Academical